Daniel James Butterworth (born 14 September 1999) is an English professional footballer who plays as a forward for  club Port Vale, on loan from  club Blackburn Rovers.

A former Manchester United trainee, Butterworth joined Blackburn Rovers and went on to make his senior debut for the club in August 2018. He spent the second half of the 2021–22 season on loan at Fleetwood Town and joined Port Vale on loan for the 2022–23 campaign.

Career
Born in Manchester, Butterworth began his career with the club he supported, Manchester United, before he joined Blackburn Rovers on a scholarship midway through the 2015–16 season. He turned professional upon signing a two-year contract in October 2017 after he scored 16 goals in 36 appearances for Damien Johnson's development squad. He made his senior debut at Ewood Park on 28 August 2018, coming on as a 72nd-minute substitute for Danny Graham in a 4–1 victory over Lincoln City in the EFL Cup. He signed a new long-term deal in March the following year, keeping him at the club until June 2022. He made his Championship debut on 22 April, playing the last 14 minutes of a 1–0 home win over Bolton Wanderers. He featured just once in the next two seasons, playing as a substitute in a 1–0 defeat at Stoke City on 19 December 2020. Manager Tony Mowbray said that Butterworth "will burst onto the scene in the next year and everyone is going to think ‘wow, who’s that?'"

He made his first start in the English Football League on 19 October 2021, in a 1–0 defeat at Queens Park Rangers. On 31 January 2022, he joined League One side Fleetwood Town on loan for the remainder of the 2021–22 season. He scored his first goal in senior football in a 3–2 defeat at Burton Albion on 12 March, scoring with his first touch after entering the game as a substitute. He made five starts and seven substitute appearances for Stephen Crainey's "Cod Army", helping Fleetwood to retain their third tier status with a 20th-place finish.

On 1 September 2022, Butterworth joined League One side Port Vale on loan for the 2022–23 season. Manager Darrell Clarke compared him to the club's number nine, James Wilson, for his link up play. On 29 October, he scored his first goal for the club to secure a 1–0 victory over Lincoln City at Vale Park. He scored his second league goal of the campaign on 19 November, the club website describing how he "produced a beautiful second half solo goal" to beat Charlton Athletic 1–0. Butterworth said after the game that "this is the best I have felt in a long time".

Style of play
Butterworth has stated that he likes playing as a number 10, playing alongside a target man and getting into pockets of space. He is able to shoot with both feet. Speaking in November 2022, Port Vale assistant manager Andy Crosby said that "Dan has incredible talent in possession; he can create chances, he can score, he can play the final pass", though added that he needed to improve other aspects of his game.

Career statistics

References

1999 births
Living people
Footballers from Manchester
English footballers
Association football forwards
Blackburn Rovers F.C. players
Fleetwood Town F.C. players
Port Vale F.C. players
English Football League players